The 460th Fighter-Interceptor Training Squadron is an inactive United States Air Force unit.  Its last assignment was with Tactical Air Command's 325th Fighter Weapons Wing at Tyndall Air Force Base, Florida, where it was inactivated on 15 October 1982.

History

World War II
Established in late 1942 as a ground support squadron.  Deployed to the Pacific Theater of Operations in 1943 to Australia where the unit functioned as a ground support unit at Sydney Airport, then at Dobodura in New Guinea.  Converted to a P-47 Thunderbolt operational combat unit, engaged in fighter-bomber operations against Japanese positions in New Guinea, Netherlands East Indies and also during the Philippines Campaign (1944–1945).  Moved to Okinawa, then Japan after the Japanese Capitulation as part of the Occupation Force, inactivated in 1946.

Air defense

Reactivated in 1954 as part of the U.S. Air Force Air Defense Command, stationed at Knoxville, for air defense of the Oak Ridge National Laboratory and TVA dams in eastern Tennessee. Moved to Portland AFB, Oregon, and flew air defense missions over the Pacific Northwest, later to southern California in 1968 at Oxnard AFB, which closed a year later; it then moved to Grand Forks AFB, North Dakota, until inactivated as part of the drawdown of ADC in 1974.

Fighter training
Reactivated briefly in early 1982 as an air defense training squadron at Tyndall AFB, Florida; inactivated late the same year.

Lineage
 Constituted as the 1st Airdrome Squadron on 7 November 1942
 Activated on 20 November 1942
 Redesignated 460th Fighter Squadron, Single Engine on 14 July 1944
 Inactivated on 20 February 1946
 Redesignated 460th Fighter-Interceptor Squadron on 23 March 1953
 Activated on 18 March 1954
 Discontinued on 25 March 1966
 Activated on 1 September 1968 (not organized)
 Organized on 30 September 1968
 Inactivated on 30 July 1974
 Redesignated 460th Fighter-Interceptor Training Squadron on 1 October 1980
 Activated on 15 November 1980
 Inactivated on 15 October 1982

Assignments
 Air Service Command, 20 November 1942
 Second Air Force, 28 December 1942
 16th Bombardment Training Wing, c. 15 February 1943
 Fifth Air Force, c. 1 June 1943 (attached to 310th Bombardment Wing, 1 February 1944; 85th Fighter Wing, c. 16 May–14 July 1944
 V Fighter Command, 14 July 1944
 348th Fighter Group, 23 September 1944 – 20 February 1946
 516th Air Defense Group, 18 March 1954
 337th Fighter Group, 18 August 1955 – 25 March 1966
 414th Fighter Group, 1 September 1968
 408th Fighter Group, 1 December 1969
 25th Air Division, 1 October 1970 – 30 July 1974
 Air Defense, Tactical Air Command, 15 November 1980
 325th Fighter Weapons Wing, 15 August 1981 – 15 October 1982

Stations

 Syracuse Army Air Base, New York, 20 November 1942
 Biggs Field, Texas, 2 February – 17 April 1943
 Sydney, New South Wales, Australia, 21 May 1943
 Dobodura Airfield Complex, (Papua) New Guinea, 20 June 1943
 Gusap Airfield, (Papua) New Guinea, 23 October 1943
 Nadzab Airfield Complex, (Papua) New Guinea, 23 July 1944
 Kornasoren Airfield, Noemfoor Island, New Guinea (Irian Jaya), Netherlands East Indies, 23 September 1944
 Tacloban Airfield, Leyte, Philippines, 10 November 1944
 Tanauan Airfield, Leyte, Philippines, 12 December 1944
 San Marcelino Airfield, Luzon, Philippines, 6 February 1945

 Floridablanca Airfield, Luzon, Philippines, 15 May 1945
 Ie Shima Airfield, Okinawa, 12 July 1945
 Itazuke Army Air Base, Japan, 24 November 1945 – 20 February 1946
 McGhee Tyson Airport, Tennessee, 18 March 1954
 Portland International Airport, Oregon, 18 August 1955 – 25 March 1966
 Oxnard Air Force Base, California, 1 September 1968
 Kingsley Field, Oregon, 31 December November 1969 – 1971
 Grand Forks AFB, North Dakota, 1 April 1971 – 15 July 1974
 Peterson Field, Colorado, 15 November 1980
 Tyndall Air Force Base, Florida, 15 August–15 October 1982

Aircraft
 A-20 Havoc, 1944
 P-47 Thunderbolt, 1944–1945
 P-51 Mustang, 1945–1946
 F-86D Sabre Interceptor, 1954–1955
 F-89 Scorpion, 1955–1958
 F-102 Delta Dagger, 1958–1966; TF-102, 1982
 F-106 Delta Dart, 1968–1974

References

 Notes

Bibliography

External links

0460
Fighter squadrons of the United States Air Force
Aerospace Defense Command units
1942 establishments in the United States